German Squash Association ("Deutscher Squash Verband" in German), also known as the DSQV is the governing body of squash federations and clubs in Germany.

See also
 Germany men's national squash team
 Germany women's national squash team

External links
 Official site (in German)

Squash in Germany
Squash
National members of the World Squash Federation